Agra guatemalena is a species of carabid beetle. The holotype was collected in Costa Rica and first described to science in 1932 by Ernő Csíki.

References 

Lebiinae
Beetles described in 1932